The Standard Six was an American automobile manufactured in St. Louis, Missouri by the St. Louis Car Company from 1909 until 1910.  The company initially built the French Mors cars under license as the American Mors from 1906 to 1909.  In 1910, Standard Six manufacturing was moved to Wabash, Indiana where production ended in 1911.

History 
The St. Louis Car Company,  better known for their railway cars,  built the American Mors car from 1906 to 1909.  In August of 1909 the St. Louis Car Company announced its would manufacture its own six-cylinder automobile of American design.  George J. Kobusch who oversaw American Mors manufacturing remained in charge of the factory producing the new Standard Six.

The Standard Six was a 50-hp car on a 124-inch wheelbase chassis with a three-speed transmission and shaft-drive. Pricing was $3,000 for a touring car, miniature tonneau or roadster, with a limousine selling for $4,000.

In February of 1910 manufacture of the Standard Six was move to a subsidiary plant in Wabash, Indiana.  Financial difficulties were encountered in Indiana, and production was discontinued later in 1910.  In February 1911 John I. Beggs replaced George Kobush and production was reinstated, but for a short time only.

St. Louis Car Company left the automotive industry for a decade until they tried again with the Skelton automobile.

References

External links 

Defunct motor vehicle manufacturers of the United States
Motor vehicle manufacturers based in Missouri
Motor vehicle manufacturers based in Indiana
Vehicle manufacturing companies established in 1909
Vehicle manufacturing companies disestablished in 1911
Cars introduced in 1909
Brass Era vehicles
1910s cars